The Unbearable Lightness of Being a Prawn Cracker is a collection of Will Self's Real Meals column for the New Statesman. Covering such things as London Cheesecake, Pizza Express, ready meals and fast food cuisine. The title is a play on Milan Kundera's The Unbearable Lightness of Being.

Content
The collection of columns covers a variety of non-traditional culinary experiences to provide a counterpoint to the more idealistic style of food reviewing. Self's stated aim for the column was as follows:

Most food writing and restaurant criticism is concerned with the ideal, with how by cooking this, or dining there, you can somehow ingurgitate a new - or at any rate improved - social, aesthetic and even spiritual persona. I aimed to turn this proposition on its head, and instead of commenting on where and what people would ideally like to eat I would consider where and what they actually did: the ready meals, buffet snacks and - most importantly - fast food that millions of Britons chomp upon in the go-round of their often hurried and dyspeptic lives.

Reviews
Benedicte Page writing for The Guardian observed...

"...it sees Self take an entertaining trip around the less celebrated of our eateries while dissecting his own fast-food addictions."

References

External links
Official Will Self site

Books about food and drink